{{Infobox artist
| bgcolour      = 
| name          = George Hager
| image         = Geo Hager.jpg
| image_size    = 150px
| alt           = 
| caption       = Caricature of  George Hager, done by one of the members of the Seattle Cartoonists' Club for the club's 1911 book about famous Seattleites. 
| birth_name    = Luther George Hager
| birth_date    =March 1885  
| birth_place   =Indiana
| death_date    = 
| death_place   =
| nationality   = American
| spouse        = Beatrice Holbrook Dearborn (daughter of Henry Holbrook Dearborn)<ref name=dearborn>[http://www.genealogybank.com/gbnk/newspapers/doc/v2:127D718D1E33F961%40GBNEWS-12894EB4F2BAC464%40-12822CD883A5B11F%40/ Seattle Daily Times, January 1, 1910, page 1. Rich young woman will wed artist: Beatrice Holbrook Dearborn, Daughter of Seattle Pioneer, to be Married to Luther George Hager Tonight.]</ref>
| children      = Carol L. Hager
| relatives     =George "Doc" Hager
| field         = drawing
| training      = Arts Student League, New York and University of Washington, Seattle
| movement      = 
| works         = The Adventures of the Waddles| patrons       = 
| influenced by = 
| influenced    = 
| awards        = 
| elected       = 
| website       = 
}}
George Hager was a Seattle illustrator and editorial cartoonist who worked for the Seattle Post-Intelligencer in the early 20th century. He was the son of another Seattle cartoonist, John Hager, known to his readers as DOK. He is known for being the first illustrator to show the Pike Place Market in Seattle.

George also edited children's page for the Christian Science Monitor  He studied art at the University of Washington and the Arts Student League in New York, where another Seattle cartoonist, William Charles McNulty taught. He was also a member of the Seattle Cartoonists' Club, and illustrated several of the famous men in the club's book, The Cartoon; A Reference Book of Seattle's Successful Men.

His signature was different from his father's. John Hager signed his DOC, a reference to his nickname that he acquired as a dentist. George Hager signed his Geo Hager.

Comic strip, The Waddles
Waddles was a duck drawn by George Hager for the Christian Science Monitor in the cartoon strip The Adventures of the Waddles''. According to the Seattle Daily Times, Waddles was a continuation of his father's duck, associated with the weather man. Dok had to discontinue his illustrating when his eyes went, and his children ran the Waddles comic strip. Dok's daughter, Mrs. George Dearborne wrote the rhyming lines to go with the cartoon, while son George Hager did the illustration.

References 

Artists from Seattle
People from Indiana
American comics artists
American editorial cartoonists
American caricaturists
American illustrators
1885 births
Year of death missing